Hildegard Martha Lächert (19 March 1920 – 14 April 1995) was a female guard, or Aufseherin, at several concentration camps controlled by Nazi Germany. She became publicly known for her service at Ravensbrück, Majdanek and Auschwitz-Birkenau.

In October 1942, at the age of 22, Lächert, a German nurse, was called to serve at Majdanek as an Aufseherin. During her time in Majdanek, Lächert was recalled as having been extremely brutal. Lächert was disciplined by her SS superiors at least three times, albeit all for administrative offensives. She spent five days in jail for violating a curfew, and another eight days in jail for losing her pistol. In 1944, after the birth of her third child, Lächert served at Auschwitz concentration camp. She fled the camp in December 1944 ahead of the advancing Red Army. There are reports that her last overseeing jobs were at Bolzano, a detention camp in northern Italy, and at the Mauthausen-Gusen concentration camp in Austria.

In July 1945, Lächert, whose crimes had not been discovered yet, returned to Berlin and worked in an American hospital until October, after which she returned to Austria to continue nursing. On 30 March 1946, Austrian police officers arrested Lächert since she had previously worked with the SS. She was transferred to British custody, and then extradited to Poland in December.

In November 1947, the former member of the Schutzstaffel (SS) appeared in a Kraków, Poland courtroom, along with 40 other SS guards in the Auschwitz trial. Lächert sat next to three other former SS women, Alice Orlowski, Therese Brandl, and Luise Danz. Because of her war crimes in Auschwitz and Płaszów, the former guard and mother of two surviving children was given a sentence of 15 years in prison. Lächert was released from prison under an amnesty on 7 December 1956. Lächert subsequently received 6000 DM from the West German government as an alleged prisoner of war. After her release, Lächert briefly worked with the CIA and BND, which at the time was routinely interviewing Nazi war criminals who had been released from prisons in Eastern Europe. Lächert's work with the agencies ended after only a few months since she was quickly deemed useless.

In August 1973, Lächert was arrested by West German officials, and questioned about her past in Majdanek, due to the upcoming third Majdanek Trial. Lächert was released, but then rearrested as a suspect in June 1979 and put on trial.

The testimonies heard concerning Lächert's sadistic behaviour were extensive and detailed. One former prisoner, Henryka Ostrowska, testified, "We always said blutige about the fact that she struck until blood showed," giving her the nickname "Bloody Brigitte" (Krwawa Brygida in Polish). Many other witnesses characterized her as the "worst" or "the most cruel" Aufseherin, as "Beast", and as "Fright of the Prisoners." For her part in selections to the gas chamber, releasing her dog onto inmates and her overall abuse, the court sentenced her to 12 years imprisonment for her complicity to the murder of 1196 prisoners in the Majdanek trials. Prosecutors had requested a life sentence. Lächert never had to serve this time, since her imprisonment in Poland and the time she spent in custody awaiting trial were allowed as time served. She died in 1995.

Further reading
 G. Álvarez, Mónica. "Guardianas Nazis. El lado femenino del mal" (Spanish). Madrid: Grupo Edaf, 2012.

References

Female Nazis, The Holocaust History Project, retrieved on August 17, 2016.
Auschwitz Trial (November-December 1947), Jewish Virtual Library, retrieved on December 22, 2006.

1920 births
1995 deaths
Kraków-Płaszów concentration camp personnel
Majdanek concentration camp personnel
Mauthausen concentration camp personnel
People convicted in the Auschwitz trial
People convicted in the Majdanek trials
Holocaust perpetrators in Poland
Prisoners and detainees of Germany
Prisoners and detainees of the British military
Prisoners and detainees of Austria
People extradited to Poland
Ravensbrück concentration camp personnel
People from Berlin
Auschwitz concentration camp personnel
Female guards in Nazi concentration camps
German women nurses
German people convicted of crimes against humanity